Leila may refer to:
Leila (name), a female given name, including a list of people with the name and its variants

Film and television 
Leila (1997 film), an Iranian film
Leïla (2001 film), a Danish film 
Leila (TV series), Indian television series

Music
Leila (music producer) or Leila Arab, Iranian musician now living in the United Kingdom
"Leila" (song), a 1981 song by ZZ Top from El Loco
"Leïla", a 1994 song by Lara Fabian from Carpe Diem

Other uses
Leila (novel), 2017 novel by Indian journalist Prayaag Akbar
Leila, Estonia, a village in Kullamaa Parish, Lääne County, Estonia

See also
Laila (disambiguation)
Layla (disambiguation)
Leela (disambiguation)
Lejla (disambiguation)
Lelia (disambiguation)
Lela (disambiguation)
Leľa, a municipality in Slovakia
Lila (disambiguation)